Ardiles-Waku Menga (born 28 September 1983) is a Congolese professional footballer who plays as a striker for German club Sportfreunde Lotte.

Career
Born in Kinshasa, Menga grew up in Germany, playing youth football for TSV Venne. He began his professional career in 2001 with VfL Osnabrück, where he was topscorer in the 2006–07 season with 15 goals. He moved to Hansa Rostock in 2007, but was released on 15 December 2008. He signed for Werder Bremen II on 7 January 2009, but he was released at the end of the 2009–10 season, later signing with SV Wehen Wiesbaden. On 18 September 2012, he joined SC Preußen Münster.

References

External links
 
 

Living people
1983 births
Footballers from Kinshasa
Association football forwards
Democratic Republic of the Congo footballers
VfL Osnabrück players
FC Hansa Rostock players
SV Werder Bremen II players
SV Wehen Wiesbaden players
SC Preußen Münster players
VfB Oldenburg players
BSV Schwarz-Weiß Rehden players
Sportfreunde Lotte players
Bundesliga players
2. Bundesliga players
3. Liga players
Regionalliga players
Oberliga (football) players
Democratic Republic of the Congo expatriate footballers
Democratic Republic of the Congo expatriate sportspeople in Germany
Expatriate footballers in Germany
21st-century Democratic Republic of the Congo people